Tar-Baby is a doll made of tar from the second of the Uncle Remus stories.

Tar Baby may also refer to:

 Tar Baby (novel), a 1981 novel by Toni Morrison
 Tar Baby (comics), a Marvel Comics character
 "Tar Baby", a song on the 1985 album Promise by English band Sade
 Tar Baby Option, the United States State Department name for President Richard Nixon's policy during the late 1960s and early 1970s of strengthening contacts with the white-minority governments in southern Africa

See also
 Tar Babies, a Madison, Wisconsin based band
 Sam Langford, (1883-1956) boxer nicknamed "The Boston Tar Baby"